Rasna is a village in Kamenets District, Brest Region, Belarus, close to the Belarus–Poland border. It is the administrative center of Rasyanska Rural Settlement since 2013.

References

Villages in Belarus
Brestsky Uyezd
Polesie Voivodeship
Populated places in Brest Region
Brest Litovsk Voivodeship
Kamenets District